{{DISPLAYTITLE:C19H26O2}}
The molecular formula C19H26O2 (molar mass: 286.40 g/mol, exact mass: 286.19328) may refer to:

 Androstenedione, a natural steroid
 1-Androstenedione, a synthetic anabolic steroid
 5-Androstenedione, a synthetic anabolic steroid
 Boldenone, an anabolic steroid for veterinary use
 Cannabichromevarin, a cannabinoid, CBCV
 Cannabidivarin, a cannabinoid, CBDV
 Methyldienolone, a synthetic anabolic steroid
 Methylestradiol, a synthetic estrogen
 7α-Methylestradiol
 7α-Methyl-19-norandrostenedione
 O-1918, a synthetic cannabinoid
 Tetrahydrocannabivarin, a cannabinoid